FC TVMK is a defunct Estonian football club. TVMK won the Estonian Meistriliiga in 2005. They are also multiple winners of the Estonian Cup.

History

Name History
TVMK (1951–1991)
TVMV (1992)
Tevalte-Marlekor (1995–1996)
FC Marlekor (1996–1997)
TVMK (1997–2008)

Founded in 1951, TVMK played in regional leagues until 1986, when the club eneterd the "Jõgeva III division", winning promotion to the II liiga the same year. TVMK won the Estonian SSR title in 1990 and the league plus cup double the following year, the last title before Estonia regained its independence. The club was renamed TVMV Tallinn for the next season. The following year the club was acquired by the Nikol company and it is generally believed that the history of the original TVMK ended at that point. The newly created Nikol Tallinn served as a prototype for the creation of Lantana Tallinn two years later. Just to avoid any possible confusion, Nikol is usually viewed as a separate club. The future of TVMK and its history is generally linked with the acquisition of Tevalte Tallinn (formerly "Vigri") by the Marlekor company in 1995, the same company that privatized "Tallinn's furniture and plywood factory" (abbreviated simply as TVMK in Estonian) in 1993. The company's name was changed to "AS TVMK" in 1997 and the club's historic name was restored the same year.

TVMK won their first Meistriliiga title in 2005.

After the title

After winning the title TVMK lost several key players to other clubs in the pre-season. Club top scorers Ingemar Teever and Tarmo Neemelo left to Sweden (although the latter would later return on loan, after a troubled start abroad), Maksim Smirnov and Deniss Malov left for rivals FC Levadia, Egidijus Juška returned to Lithuania. Vyacheslav Bulavin continued as the head coach, but was sacked in mid-season, with the former Russia international Sergei Yuran taking over. The fortunes didn't change much though, and the highlights of the season were winning the Estonian Cup and Estonian Super Cup, as the club finished only fourth in the league. The following season Yuran left for Shinnik Yaroslavl. Vjatšeslav Smirnov took over and led the team to a third-place finish in the league. After the 2007 season Pjotr Sedin, the chairman, announced that the club is currently considering a possibility of giving up their professional status, because of financial difficulties.

Achievements
Meistriliiga: (1)
2005

Estonian Cup: (2)
2002–03, 2005–06

Estonian SuperCup: (2)
2005, 2006

FC TVMK in Estonian Football

UEFA club competition results
As of 1 August 2008:

 1Q = 1st Qualifying Round

References

 
TVMK Tallinn
Association football clubs established in 1951
TVMK
TVMK
1951 establishments in Estonia
2008 disestablishments in Estonia
Association football clubs disestablished in 2008